David Lindberg may refer to:

David C. Lindberg (1935–2015), American historian of science
David R. Lindberg (born 1948), American malacologist

See also
 Lindberg (disambiguation)